Semai may refer to:
Semai people
Semai language

Language and nationality disambiguation pages